The Oberelbische Verkehrsgesellschaft Pirna-Sebnitz (OVPS) was a company that operated public transport services in the German state of Saxony. It was a member of the Verkehrsverbund Oberelbe (Upper Elbe Transport Association), a transport association that manages a common public transport structure for Dresden and its surrounding areas.

The OVPS's area of operations included large parts of the district of Sächsische Schweiz-Osterzgebirge as well as stubs extending into the state capital city of Dresden and the district of Bautzen. This area is often described as Saxon Switzerland.

The services of the OVPS included:

 Urban bus services in the town of Pirna
 Urban bus services in the town of Sebnitz
 Regional bus services in the surrounding areas
 Ferry services on the River Elbe
 The Kirnitzschtal Tramway, a tourist oriented rural tram service

As of January 1, 2019, the two companies were merged to form the Regionalverkehr Sächsische Schweiz-Osterzgebirge GmbH (RVSOE).

Gallery

References

External links 
 
 Oberelbische Verkehrsgesellschaft Pirna-Sebnitz

Pirna
Sächsische Schweiz-Osterzgebirge
Transport in Saxony
Sebnitz